Glynn Williams (born on 30 March 1939 in Shrewsbury, England, UK) is a British sculptor. Once an abstract artist, he has worked in the figurative tradition since the late 1970s.

Life 
After attending Wolverhampton College of Art in 1955, he worked at the British School in Rome until 1963 after winning the British Prix de Rome scholarship. In 1976, he became Head of the Wimbledon School of Art Sculpture Department, before moving to the Royal College of Art, London, where he became Head of Sculpture in 1990 and Head of the School of Fine Art from 1995 to 2010. He is a Fellow of Royal College of Art, the Royal Society of British Sculptors, and the RSA.

During the 1970s he made abstract sculptures, including crate-like objects in wood, but later in the decade he began carving stone figures.

Public Sculpture
Lloyd George in Parliament Square, London
Henry Purcell memorial, Westminster, London
Portrait of Lord Annan, National Portrait Gallery

Portraits of Glynn Williams
A photographic portrait of Williams by Sue Adler exists in the National Portrait Gallery.

A terracotta head by Jon Edgar was exhibited at Yorkshire Sculpture Park in 2013 as part of the Sculpture Series Heads  exhibition.

References

External links
Glynn Williams Website
Guardian article 9/12/13 referencing Williams as expert adviser to Westminster Council, commenting on Nelson Mandela statue

Living people
1939 births
British sculptors
British male sculptors
Academics of the Royal College of Art
Academics of Wimbledon College of Arts
Prix de Rome (Britain) winners